Leonard Richard Phillips (1870–1947) was a Reform Party Member of Parliament in New Zealand.

He was elected to the Waitemata electorate in the 1908 general election, but retired in 1911.

References

1870 births
1947 deaths
Reform Party (New Zealand) MPs
Members of the New Zealand House of Representatives
New Zealand MPs for Auckland electorates
Independent MPs of New Zealand